JDS Yukikaze (DD-102) was the second ship of Harukaze-class destroyers, and the second destroyer of the Japanese Maritime Self Defense Force to be built in Japan since the end of World War II.

Construction and career
The ship was laid down at the Mitsubishi shipyard in Nagasaki on 17 December 1954, launched on 20 August 1955 and commissioned on 31 July 1956 with the hull number (DD-102). She was put into service on 31 July, and was incorporated into the Yokosuka District Force.

On 1 April 1957, it became the flagship of the 2nd Self-Defense Fleet and the flagship of the 1st Escort Group in place of the guard ship JDS Keyaki.

From 10 January – 26 March 1959, a special renovation work was carried out at the Ishikawajima Heavy Industries Tokyo Factory, and four rear depth charge projectors and one depth charge projection rail were removed, and Mk.2 was short. Equipped with one torpedo launcher on each side. Replaced anti-submarine active sonar from QHBa to SQS-11A and passive sonar from QDA to SQR-4 / SQA-4. Replaced the 5-inch gun fire control system from Mk.51 to Mk.57. In addition, construction work was carried out, such as the installation of a new identification friend or foe device, the replacement of the electronic warfare device from OLR-3 to OLR-4, and the installation of air conditioning and ventilation equipment in the battle compartment rooms. On 1 July, the same year, the Self-Defense Fleet Command abolished the concurrent role of the 1st Escort Group Command, and along with this, Yukikaze became the flagship under the direct control of the Self-Defense Fleet.

In February 1960, an offshore refueling device was installed. From 18 May to 22 July of the same year, he participated in the 4th pelagic practice voyage and visited Hawaii and the west coast of the United States.

On 26 July 1961 (Showa 36), the role of the flagship of the Self-Defense Fleet was transferred to the escort ship  and incorporated into the 1st escort group as a flagship.

In 1963, the filming location of the movie "駆逐艦雪風" released the following year was performed, and it appeared as the predecessor destroyer Yukikaze.

On 10 December 1964, it was incorporated into the 3rd Escort Group as a flagship and the fixed port was transferred to Maizuru.

In March 1969, Maizuru Heavy Industries carried out a modernization renovation to replace the sonar with SQS-29J.

On 1 February 1971, he was transferred to the 12th Escort Corps, which was newly formed under the 3rd Escort Corps group along with the consort ship JDS Harukaze, and the fixed port was also transferred to Sasebo. This was the first time that both ships had formed an escort.

On 16 December 1973, the 12th Escort Corps was abolished and transferred to the Practical Experiment Corps. The fixed port is transferred to Yokosuka again.

He was dispatched to the disposal site and fired for submerged disposal from the 27th to the 28th of the following day.

In January 1976, a renovation for practical testing was carried out at Sumitomo Heavy Industries Uraga Shipyard, and the 5-inch No. 3 turret, the depth charge projector K gun and the depth charge drop rail were removed, and towed to the stern. Equipped with a type passive sonar. Since then, he has been engaged in practical experiments of towed passive sonar.

On 1 July 1978, the Practical Experiment Team was integrated into the Development Guidance Group, and the ship belongs to the same group.

On 27 March 1981, she was changed to a training auxiliary ship, and the ship hull number was changed to (ASU-7003).

She was decommissioned on 27 March 1985.

Until November 2001, it was moored and stored at the Maritime Self-Defense Force 1st Service School as a special pier, but it was sold due to significant damage caused by salt damage, and it was dismantled after leaving the area on the 19th of the same month.

Gallery

References

 

1955 ships
Harukaze-class destroyers
Ships built by Mitsubishi Heavy Industries